Pay Risheh Kuh (also Romanized as Pāy Rīsheh Kūh) is a village in Abolfares Rural District, in the Central District of Ramhormoz County, Khuzestan Province, Iran. At the 2006 census, its population was 139, in 28 families.

References 

Populated places in Ramhormoz County